P28 may refer to:

 Consolidated P-28, an American prototype fighter aircraft
 , a stealth corvette of the Indian Navy
 Papyrus 28, a biblical manuscript
 Percival P.28 Proctor, a British radio trainer and communications aircraft
 Phosphorus-28, an isotope of phosphorus
 P28, a Latvian state regional road